The Gaskell Ball is a Victorian-styled ball held by Ye Gaskell Occasional Dance Society in Oakland, California, United States, popular among historical re-creationists and vintage dance enthusiasts.

The ball came to be over 25 years ago, as an offshoot of a dance portion of the Great Dickens Christmas Fair held in San Francisco.

The event was held at Oakland's Scottish Rite Center on the shore of Lake Merritt every two months through the end of 2014. Due to the increased costs of the hall, the event has become less frequent; only one ball was held in 2015, in October.  Music for the event is provided by "Brassworks", a popular local band. The evening  includes a basic vintage waltz lesson for early attendees and some small potluck refreshments.  Dances are taught during a brief course before the ball begins, and include vintage waltz, schottische, polka, mazurka, and several English country dances.  Occasionally, groups will form on the sidelines to dance alternate arrangements to the English Country songs; previous examples include Irish four-hand reels, the Scottish country dance "Petronella", the Virginia reel, and various Contra dances.  Full Victorian dress is not required; the dress code is formal wear of the nineteenth or twentieth centuries. A minimum of semi-formal attire is requested by the ball staff.  Although seldom exercised, the staff reserves the right to refuse entrance to those who are inappropriately attired.  There are occasional performances by local dance troupes during the intermission, however there is no official dance group affiliated with the ball.

The Gaskell Ball is a favorite among dancers from the Stanford, UC Berkeley and UC Santa Cruz social dance circles, and is widely credited for popularizing John Hertz's Congress of Vienna Waltz and Richard Powers' Bohemian National Polka choreographies.

Decreasing attendance and other venues providing similar experiences, the Gaskell Ball committee decided to stop holding the Balls in 2016.

History
The Gaskell Ball is named for the British writer Elizabeth Gaskell. The Gaskell Ball originated in 1979, when the troupe playing the Gaskell family at the Charles Dickens Fair decided to hold a ball in her honor. The first ball was held at Mills College, a women's college in Oakland. In proceeding years it was held at the Veterans' Auditorium in Oakland. In the 1990s the ball outgrew the hall and was moved to accommodate the increased attendance.

References

External links
 The Gaskell Ball homepage
 The Oakland Scottish Rite Center
 Richard Powers
 Stanford Social Dance
 Richard Powers' Bohemian National Polka choreography

Balls in the United States
Historical dance
Culture of Oakland, California